A Song for You is the fourth studio album by American music duo Carpenters, released on June 22, 1972. According to Richard Carpenter, A Song for You was intended to be a concept album (of sorts) with the title tune opening and closing the set and the bookended selections comprising the 'song'. "A Song for You" was written by songwriter Leon Russell.

In Cash Boxs Top 100 Albums of 1972, A Song for You was ranked number 26.

Six songs were released as A-side singles internationally: "Hurting Each Other", "It's Going to Take Some Time", "Goodbye to Love", "Top of the World", "I Won't Last a Day Without You", and "Bless the Beasts and Children".

Singles
"Hurting Each Other", a cover of an obscure Ruby & the Romantics tune, was the first single issued from A Song for You in early 1972, and reached number two, becoming the Carpenters' sixth straight gold single. A cover of Carole King's "It's Going to Take Some Time" followed and peaked at number 12, and was followed by the number seven hit "Goodbye to Love", which was refused airplay on some easy listening radio stations because of a fuzz guitar solo by Tony Peluso. The song had a significant impact on the power ballad songs which followed. The album also included the Carpenters' version of the Academy Award-nominated title song from the 1971 film Bless the Beasts and Children, which had already charted at number 67 on the Hot 100 as the flip side of the duo's version of "Superstar".

The album's biggest hit single, the number one song "Top of the World", was not issued until over a year after the album's release. According to Richard Carpenter, who co-wrote the song with John Bettis, the reason for the song's late release in the US was that he had misjudged the song's commercial appeal, but was proven wrong when the Carpenters' "Top of the World" became a hit in Japan in 1972 and Lynn Anderson's cover reached number 2 on the US country charts in 1973. The song went through a few minor revisions, including a slight remix, before it was finally released as a single in the US. The Carpenters' treatment of the much-covered Paul Williams/Roger Nichols composition "I Won't Last a Day Without You" also got a belated single release in 1974, and peaked at number eleven on the Hot 100.

With the exception of "Bless the Beasts and Children", which peaked at number 26 on the AC chart, all of the album's charted singles made either number one ("Hurting Each Other", "I Won't Last a Day Without You") or number two on the Adult Contemporary chart. The album and its singles were also successful internationally; "Goodbye to Love" and "I Won't Last a Day Without You" made the top ten on the UK Singles Chart as a double A-side, and "Top of the World" made the Oricon singles chart in Japan on three occasions (number 21 in 1972, number 52 in 1973, and number 83 in 1996).

Track listing
All lead vocals by Karen Carpenter, except where noted.

Personnel
Karen Carpenter – lead and backing vocals, drums
Richard Carpenter – lead and backing vocals, piano, Wurlitzer electronic piano, Hammond organ, celesta, orchestration
Tony Peluso – lead guitar
Louie Shelton – guitar
Red Rhodes – steel guitar
Buddy Emmons – pedal steel guitar on "Top of the World"
Joe Osborn – bass guitar
Hal Blaine – drums
Earl Dumler – oboe, English horn
Bob Messenger – tenor saxophone, flute, alto flute
Tim Weisberg – bass flute on "It's Going to Take Some Time"
Norm Herzberg – bassoon
Gary Coleman – percussion on "Hurting Each Other"
Bernie Grundman, Richard Carpenter – remastering at Bernie Grundman Mastering

Charts and certifications

Weekly charts

Year-end charts

Certifications

References

External links
 The Carpenters - A Song for You (1972) album releases & credits at Discogs

1972 albums
A&M Records albums
Albums produced by Jack Daugherty (musician)
Albums recorded at A&M Studios
Concept albums
The Carpenters albums